Azeem Dar (born 11 December 1996) is a Pakistani cricketer. He made his first-class debut for Khan Research Laboratories in the 2017–18 Quaid-e-Azam Trophy on 2 November 2017.

Before relocating to Pakistan Dar represented Scotland and was part of their 2016 Under 19 World Cup squad.

References

External links
 

1996 births
Living people
Pakistani cricketers
Place of birth missing (living people)
Khan Research Laboratories cricketers